Saturnino Álvarez Bugallal (February 11, 1834 in Ponteareas – May 30, 1885) was a Spanish lawyer, journalist and politician.

He was Minister of Justice during the reign of Alfonso XII of Spain. He was a deputy in Congress on for Ourense (province) and Pontevedra (province) and elected in most of the elections between 1858 and 1884, as senator for Ourense in 1884. He was Minister of Justice on two occasions: between 6 January and 7 March 1879, and between 9 December 1879 and 8 February 1881 in individual governments presided over by Antonio Cánovas del Castillo. He also served as the 18th Attorney General of Spain.

He died on May 30, 1885.

1834 births
1885 deaths
People from Ponteareas
Conservative Party (Spain) politicians
Justice ministers of Spain
Members of the Congress of Deputies (Spain)
Members of the Congress of Deputies of the Spanish Restoration
Members of the Senate of Spain
Politicians from Galicia (Spain)
19th-century Spanish lawyers
Attorneys general of Spain
Prosecutors general of Spain